Escape Plan is a 2013 American prison action thriller film starring Sylvester Stallone and Arnold Schwarzenegger, and co-starring Jim Caviezel, 50 Cent, Vinnie Jones, Vincent D'Onofrio and Amy Ryan. It was directed by Swedish filmmaker Mikael Håfström, and written by Miles Chapman and Jason Keller (under the anagram pen-name 'Arnell Jesko'). The first film to pair up Stallone and Schwarzenegger as co-leads, it follows Stallone's character Ray Breslin, a lawyer turned prison security tester who is incarcerated in the world's most secret and secure prison, and recruits fellow inmate Emil Rottmayer, portrayed by Schwarzenegger, to stage a breakout. The film is the first installment of the Escape Plan film series.

The film was released in the United States on October 18, 2013, received mixed reviews and grossed $137 million worldwide against a $54 million budget.

Plot

Former prosecutor Ray Breslin is the founder and co-owner of Breslin-Clark, a security firm specializing in testing the security measures of supermax prisons. Posing as an inmate to study facilities from within and exploit their weaknesses to escape, Breslin is driven by the murders of his wife and child by an escaped convict he had successfully prosecuted, and has garnered a reputation as the man who can escape any prison.

Breslin and his business partner, Lester Clark, receive a multimillion-dollar deal from CIA operative Jessica Miller to test a new, top secret prison for disappeared persons on the condition that Ray and his team cannot know the prison's true location. Although this violates his principles, Breslin agrees, allowing himself to be captured under the identity of a terrorist-for-hire. The plan goes awry when his captors remove a tracking microchip he had implanted in his arm and drug him, preventing his colleagues from knowing where he has been taken.

Breslin wakes up inside the prison and realizes that the warden, Hobbes, is not the same warden who was supposed to release him in an emergency. He befriends another inmate, Emil Rottmayer, who claims to be a security expert for Victor Mannheim, a faceless Robin Hood-type figure who steals from the wealthy. In order to be intentionally subjected to solitary confinement, Breslin and Rottmayer stage a fight. Breslin quickly learns the cell in question is intended to disorient and dehydrate prisoners with high-powered lights. Realizing the cell floors have rivets of steel instead of more secure aluminum, Breslin has Rottmayer acquire a metal plate from Hobbes's office floor, before they and an inmate named Javed are again consigned to solitary cells.

Using the metal plate, Breslin focuses the reflection from the lights onto the steel rivets, heating them so that they loosen when the steel expands. Following a passageway below the floor, Breslin discovers he is aboard a massive prison ship somewhere in the middle of an ocean. Breslin and Rottmayer continue to study the complex and learn the guards' routines. However, Hobbes then reveals to Breslin that he is aware of his true identity, has assigned his head of security Drake to monitor him at all times, and will ensure Breslin spends the rest of his life in the prison. Breslin offers Hobbes information on Mannheim from Rottmayer in exchange for his release; Hobbes agrees.

While Breslin feeds Hobbes false information about Mannheim, his colleagues, Abigail Ross and Hush, grow suspicious of Clark when Breslin's paycheck for the job is frozen. Hush discovers that the prison, codenamed "The Tomb," is owned by a for-profit organization linked to a notorious private security contractor. Clark is also revealed to be in contact with Hobbes about Breslin's imprisonment.

Rottmayer has Javed convince Hobbes that he is double-crossing them, and Javed is rewarded by being allowed to go above deck for his nightly prayer; this allows him to use a makeshift sextant to determine the ship's precise latitude. From this, Breslin and Rottmayer deduce they are somewhere in the Atlantic Ocean near Morocco. Breslin convinces the prison physician, Dr. Kyrie (who is also a prisoner), to help him and Rottmayer escape by sending an email to Mannheim, and transmits a false tap code message from his cell, convincing Hobbes that a riot will occur in Cell Block C. However, Javed instigates another riot at Cell Block A, allowing him, Breslin, and Rottmayer to flee to the top deck while a lockdown is initiated. Breslin kills Drake when he tries to stop them, but Javed is gunned down by Hobbes and his men. Breslin goes to the engine room to shut down the Tomb's electrical grid, giving Rottmayer time to open the deck hatch while a helicopter sent by Mannheim engages in a gunfight with the guards. Rottmayer boards the helicopter while Breslin is flushed to the bottom of the ship by the automated water system after Hobbes reboots the grid. Reaching the helicopter as Hobbes fires at him, Breslin shoots several leaking oil barrels, killing Hobbes in the explosion.

The helicopter lands on a Moroccan beach, where Rottmayer reveals he is actually Mannheim and "Jessica Miller" is in fact his daughter, who actually hired Breslin to mastermind her father's escape. Later, Ross informs Breslin that they discovered Clark was offered a $5 million salary to become CEO of the Tomb's security company, should Breslin's imprisonment prove the ship was indeed escape-proof. Hush explains that he tracked Clark to Miami and locked him in a car, which is in turn placed within a shipping container bound for an unknown destination.

Cast

Production
The spec script was initially called The Tomb. When Summit first purchased the script, Jeff Wadlow was attached to direct and Jason Keller was hired to do rewrites.

Early reports in 2010 speculated that Bruce Willis was cast as Ray Breslin and Antoine Fuqua was attached to direct. It was revealed by producer Mark Canton on The Matthew Aaron Show that Jim Caviezel had signed on to the film, playing the prison warden Hobbes.

British actor Vinnie Jones signed on to co-star as Drake, the ruthless prison guard.

Variety and other media in the news stated that Amy Ryan, Vincent D'Onofrio, and 50 Cent had joined the cast of Escape Plan. It was confirmed in mid-April that 50 Cent would play the computer expert who was once incarcerated for cyber crimes helping Breslin's character escape, D'Onofrio would play the deputy director of the high-tech prison, and Ryan would play Stallone's business partner and his potential love interest.

In an interview with the British newspaper The Sun, Vinnie Jones stated that the film was to shoot April 16 to June 23 in New Orleans. Shooting for Escape Plan was also confirmed to take place in Louisiana in the spring of 2012. In August 2012, at The Expendables 2 conference, Arnold Schwarzenegger commented on the film and stated that filming had finished. The engine room fight scene between Breslin and Drake was filmed onboard the bulk carrier RICAN, the giveaway is IMO NO 7621932 seen in several scenes.

Release

Theatrical
On April 9, 2013, it was officially announced that the film had been pushed back to a September 13, 2013 release and the film's title had been changed from The Tomb to Escape Plan. On July 18, 2013, a fan screening was held at the Reading Cinemas Gaslamp 15 at San Diego Comic-Con, which Stallone and Schwarzenegger attended. The film was theatrically released in the United States on October 18, 2013.

Reception

Box office
The film underperformed at the U.S. box office, debuting at number four on the box office chart with $9.89 million from 2,883 theaters and ultimately grossing only $25.1 million domestically. However, Escape Plan was an international box-office success, debuting at first place in several Asian and European markets, with the total international gross more than doubling its $50 million budget at $112.2 million, totaling up to a worldwide gross of $137.3 million.

Critical response
Escape Plan was met with mixed reviews from critics. Rotten Tomatoes gives the film a rating of 50%, based on reviews from 107 critics, with an average score of 5.4/10. The site's critical consensus states: "As much fun as it is to see Sylvester Stallone and Arnold Schwarzenegger team up onscreen, Escape Plan fails to offer much more than a pale imitation of 1980s popcorn thrills." Metacritic gives the film a score of 49 out of 100, based on 33 reviews, indicating "mixed or average reviews". Audiences surveyed by CinemaScore gave the film a grade "B+".

Tom Huddleston of Time Out London gave the film two out of five stars, commenting that the film "would have made a perfect vehicle for, say, a Chuck Norris or even a Jean-Claude Van Damme. But these two redoubtable, enormously watchable old-school heroes deserve better." Ben Rawson-Jones of Digital Spy gave the film four out of five stars, commenting that it "defies those who wrote off the abilities of its stars to cut the muscular mustard in today's youth-orientated cultural climate. These supposedly old dogs have plenty of life—but their effectiveness relies on the foundation of a smart script that plays to their strengths and the audience's perception of their star personas." Neil Genzlinger of The New York Times said in his review: "Mikael Håfstrom, the director, pushes the suspense buttons efficiently, and the plot twists are disguised well enough for the not-very-demanding crowd this film will draw. The scenes with Mr. Stallone and Mr. Schwarzenegger are a little disappointing — it's their first pairing as top-billed co-stars, yet the script never gives them the kind of memorable exchange that makes fans howl with delight. But all in all, Escape Plan does what it sets out to do."

Sequels

In February 2017, it was announced that a sequel was then in development with Stallone confirmed to reprise his role as Ray Breslin. In the same report it was revealed that Steven C. Miller would direct the film, with Miles Chapman returning as screenwriter. Dave Bautista, 50 Cent, and Jaime King were cast in the film. In March 2017, the official title was announced as Escape Plan 2: Hades. The film was released direct-to-video on June 29, 2018.

In April 2017, a third film entered the early stages of development with Stallone again signed on to reprise his role as Ray Breslin. The film, Escape Plan: The Extractors, was released direct-to-video on July 2, 2019.

See also
 List of American films of 2013
 Arnold Schwarzenegger filmography
 Sylvester Stallone filmography
 Lock Up, another Sylvester Stallone movie set in a prison

References

External links
 
 
 
 
 

2013 action thriller films
2010s prison films
2013 films
American action thriller films
American prison films
MoviePass Films films
Entertainment One films
Films directed by Mikael Håfström
Films scored by Alex Heffes
Films set in Colorado
Films set in Los Angeles
Films set in Miami
Films set in Morocco
Films set in New Orleans
Films set in the Atlantic Ocean
Films shot in Louisiana
Films shot in New Orleans
Lionsgate films
Films about prison escapes
Summit Entertainment films
2010s English-language films
2010s American films